IDT may refer to:

Technology
 Information  and digital technology, a digitally focused information technology landscape 
 Interdigital transducer, or interdigitated transducer, a sensor and transmitter for a surface acoustic wave
 Interrupt descriptor table, a memory structure of x86 microprocessors
 Insulation-displacement technology, or insulation-displacement termination, an electrical connector
 Interactive data transformation, a form of data transformation via a visual interface intended for analysts and business users with limited technical knowledge

Organisations
 IDT Corporation, a long-distance telephone carrier
 Integrated Device Technology, a semiconductor manufacturer
 Integrated Display Technology, a Hong Kong-based producer of LCD products
 Integrated DNA Technologies, a U.S. supplier of custom nucleic acids
 International Display Technology, a joint-venture of IBM and the Taiwanese Chi Mei group
 IDT Entertainment, film producer

Other
 Inherited disorders of trafficking
 Israel Daylight Time
 It Dies Today, a metalcore band from Buffalo, New York
 Inactive Duty Training, U.S. military duty, for example in the Inactive National Guard